The 1974 World Rowing Championships was the fourth World Rowing Championships. It was held from 4 to 8 September 1974 (for men) and from 29 August to 1 September 1974 (for women) on the Rotsee in Lucerne, Switzerland. The event was significantly extended from the 1970 edition, with the addition of both women's and lightweight men's events. Six women boat classes were added, three lightweight men classes, plus quad scull for men, increasing the number of boat classes from seven in 1970 to seventeen in 1974. This was also the last World Championships held on a quadrennial cycle – from this point, World Championships were held annually.

Medal summary

Medalists at the 1974 World Rowing Championships:

Men's events

Women's events

Event codes

Medal table
Medals by country (including lightweight rowing events):

Finals

Great Britain

References

World Rowing Championships
Rowing
Rowing
Sport in Lucerne
World Rowing Championships
Rowing
Rowing
Rowing